Lifers Group was a hip hop group formed by Maxwell Melvins while incarcerated at East Jersey State Prison in Rahway, New Jersey in 1991.

Background 
Lifers Group grew out of the Lifers Group Juvenile Awareness Program, a youth crime prevention program founded in East Jersey State Prison in 1976 and made famous by the documentary Scared Straight! Maxwell Melvins, who was transferred to the prison in 1987 and became involved with the Juvenile Awareness Program, proposed the idea of using music as a means of outreach and fundraising for the program in 1991.

The group's music industry career began when Melvins contacted producer David Funken Klein, the newly appointed head of Disney Music Group's rap subsidiary Hollywood Basic. Lifers Group's Lifers Group EP became Hollywood Basic's inaugural release in 1991, accompanied by a short documentary, Lifers Group World Tour: Rahway Prison, That's It, directed by Penelope Spheeris and released by Hollywood Basic on videocassette.

Lifers Group World Tour: Rahway Prison, That's It was nominated for a 1992 Grammy Award for Best Long Form Music Video, but Melvins and the group's other members were disallowed by prison officials from attending the ceremony.

Maxwell Melvins served 32 years in prison until he was released in 2011. He currently writes and publishes poetry in community magazines and participates in panel discussions for educational and community events.

Discography

Albums 
 1993: Living Proof

Singles & EPs 
 1991: Lifers Group (also known as #66064)
 1991: Belly Of The Beast / The Real Deal
 1991: Real Deal / Lesson 4
 1991: The Real Deal
 1993: Jack U. Back (So You Wanna Be A Gangsta) / Living Proof (Remix)
 1993: Short Life Of A Gangsta

See also 
 The Escorts – R&B group formed at East Jersey State Prison (then Rahway State Prison) in 1970

Further reading

References 

American hip hop groups
Prison music
Musical groups from New Jersey